The Abbotsford Flyers were a Junior "A" ice hockey team from Abbotsford, British Columbia, Canada.  They were a part of the British Columbia Hockey League and played in the Coastal Conference.

History
In 1983, the Flyers avenged a poor playoffs in 1981-82.  After sweeping the Burnaby Blue Hawks 4-games-to-none in the quarter-finals, the Flyers beat the New Westminster Royals 4-games-to-2 in the semi-finals, and the Kelowna Buckaroos 4-games-to-1 in the final to win their first and only BCJHL title.  In the Mowat Cup, the Flyers defeated the Williams Lake Mustangs of the Peace-Cariboo Junior Hockey League 2-games-to-none to win the BC Jr. A title.  Next, in the Alberta/British Columbia Championship, the Flyers beat the Calgary Canucks of the Alberta Junior Hockey League 4-games-to-none.  In the Western Canada Final, the Flyers beat Dauphin Kings of the Manitoba Junior Hockey League 4-games-to-2 for the Abbott Cup.  In the National Final, the 1983 Centennial Cup the Flyers finally fell to the North York Rangers of the Ontario Junior Hockey League 4-games-to-none.

In 1985, the team moved to Delta, but were replaced by the Falcons.  Both teams folded in 1988.

Season-by-season record
Note: GP = Games played, W = Wins, L = Losses, T = Ties, OTL = Overtime losses, GF = Goals for, GA = Goals against

Falcons standings

NHL alumni
Abbotsford Flyers
Doug Kostynski
Larry Lozinski
Dwight Mathiasen
Bob McGill
Larry Melnyk
Craig Redmond
Mike Zanier
Daryl Stanley
Jim Dobson

Delta Flyers
Link Gaetz
Doug MacDonald

Abbotsford Falcons
Link Gaetz
Scott King
Olaf Kolzig

See also
List of ice hockey teams in British Columbia

References

External links 
BCHL Website
Vernon Jr. 'A'/BCHL Hockey History

Defunct British Columbia Hockey League teams
Sport in Abbotsford, British Columbia
1976 establishments in British Columbia